20 Lights is the first solo extended play by American rapper Berner. It was released on January 6, 2015 via Bern One Entertainment. Production was handled by Cheeze, Cozmo, Ricky P, Sean T, Sledgren, The Elevaterz and Max Perry. It features guest appearances from Ampichino, Curren$y, Mac Dre, Migos, Smiggz, The Jacka and Wiz Khalifa. The album peaked at number 95 on the Billboard 200. Music video for "OT" was directed by David Camarena.

Track listing

Charts

References 

2015 EPs